Hajla is a mountain located between the borders of Kosovo and Montenegro. The northern slopes contains the spring formation of the Ibar river, and to its southern slopes is the origin of the Bistrica e Pejës (or the Pećka Bistrica) river. Hajla is also the highest mountain in the northern part of the Accursed Mountains of the Balkans. The nearest city to Hajla is Rožaje, in Montenegro.

Highest peaks
Hajla
Hajla e Vëranocit 
Maja Dramadol
Hajla e Shkrelit

See also
 Vrelo Ibra
 Ibar

Notes and references

Notes:

References:

Rožaje
Mountains of Montenegro
Mountains of Kosovo
Accursed Mountains
Two-thousanders of Kosovo
Two-thousanders of Montenegro